Delaney is an Irish surname derived from the Gaelic Ó Dubhshláine, Dubh meaning black and Sláine for the River Sláine (Slaney). DeLaney is also of Norman origin. There is a branch of Dulaneys in the United States who trace back to a Thomas Delany. Thomas's son, Daniel, claimed to have been descended from Dr. Gideon Delaune, a Huguenot physician and theologian and founder of the Apothecaries' Hall. Hence, there are multiple discussions among genealogical circles as to the origin of Delaney since it can be anglicised Gaelic or anglicised French.

Over time a few names derived from the names DeLaney and Ó Dubhshláine including Delaney, Delany and Dulaney.

Notable people named Delaney or Delany

 Annie Elizabeth Delany "Bessie" (1891–1995), with sister "Sadie", African-American activist and author
 Arthur Delaney (1927–1987), English painter
 Arthur Delaney (politician) (1841–1905), first mayor of Juneau, Alaska, USA
 Beauford Delaney (1901–1979), American modernist painter
 Bob Delaney (basketball) (born 1951), American NBA referee
 Bob Delaney (politician) (born 1953), Ontario politician
 Bob DeLaney (sportscaster) (1924–2008), American radio commentator
 Cameron Delaney (disambiguation), multiple people
Cameron Delaney (swimmer) (born 1980), Australian swimmer
Cameron Delaney (footballer) (born 1992), Australian rules footballer
Cameron Delaney (basketball) (born 1995), American basketball player
 Colin Delaney, American professional wrestler
 Conor P. Delaney, Irish-American colorectal surgeon and professor
 Damien Delaney, Irish footballer
 Dana Delany (born 1956), American actress
 Daniel Delaney, American restaurateur
 Daniel Delany (1747–1814), Irish Catholic bishop
 David Delany (born 1997), Irish cricketer 
 Dean Delany, Irish footballer
 Danny Delaney, GAA player
 Danny Delaney, shinty player - a great goal scorer or a scorer of great goals?
 Eamon Delaney, Irish author and former diplomat
 Edward Delaney, Irish sculptor
 Edward C. Delaney, creator of the Delaney Card
 Edward X. Delaney, the fictional detective in Lawrence Sanders' books
 Felix Ua Duib Sláin (Felix O'Dullaney), 12th–13th century bishop
 Frank Delaney, Irish writer and broadcaster
 Gareth Delany (born 1997), Irish international cricketer
 Jack Delaney, Canadian boxer in the early 20th century
 James Delaney (disambiguation), multiple people
 James Delaney, a character in the British drama series, Taboo (2017 TV series)
 James J. Delaney (1901–1987), Representative from New York
 James Delaney (boxer), also known as Jimmy Doyle, boxer who died after a bout with Sugar Ray Robinson
 James Delaney (mayor) (1896–1970), mayor of Anchorage, Alaska, 1929–1932
 James Delaney (rugby league), rugby league player
 James Delaney (tennis) (born 1953), former professional tennis player
 James Delany (born 1948), commissioner of the Big Ten Conference
 Jim Delaney (1921–2012), American athlete
 Jimmy Delaney (1914–1989), Scottish footballer
 Joe Delaney, American football player
 John Delaney (disambiguation), multiple people
 John Delaney (Bahamian lawyer) (born 1964), Attorney General and Minister of Legal Affairs
 John Delaney (baseball) (born 1985), American college baseball coach
 John Delaney (businessman) (1969–2011), Irish founder of website Intrade
 John Delaney (Florida politician) (born 1956), American lawyer and university administrator
 John Delaney (football administrator) (born 1967), Irish former sports administrator
 John Delaney (Maryland politician) (born 1963), American attorney and businessman
 John Delaney (meteorologist) (1811–1883), Irish-Canadian civil servant in Newfoundland
 John Delaney (Wisconsin lawyer), or Delany, newspaperman and state representative
 John A. Delaney (hurler) (born 1986), Irish hurler from County Laois
 John A. Delany (1852–1907), Australian conductor and composer
 John C. Delaney (1848–1915), American Civil War soldier
 John J. Delaney (1878–1948), American businessman, lawyer and U.S. Representative
 Joseph Delaney (artist) (1904–1991), painter during the Harlem Renaissance
 Joseph Delaney (1945–2022), English author
 Joseph Patrick Delaney, American bishop
 Kim Delaney, American actress
 Laura Delany (born 1992), Irish women's international cricket captain
 Lucy Delaney, African-American author
 Malcolm Delaney, American professional basketball player
 Mark Delaney (disambiguation), multiple people
 Mark Delaney (boxer) (born 1971), English boxer
 Mark Delaney (canoeist) (born 1964), Great Britain whitewater slalom canoeist
 Mark Delaney (footballer) (born 1976), Wales international footballer
 Martin Delaney (disambiguation), multiple people
 Martin Delaney (activist) (1945–2009), HIV/AIDS treatment advocate
 Martin Delaney (actor), British actor
 Martin Delany (1812–1885), African-American abolitionist
 Mary Delany (1700–1788), artist and writer
 Mattie Delaney, American blues singer and performer
 Michael Delaney (disambiguation), multiple people
 Michael C. Delaney (1849–1918), Canadian politician
 Michael Delaney (lawyer) (born 1969), American lawyer and politician
 Michael Delaney, stage name Dub-L, American record producer and songwriter
 Michael Delaney, Steve McQueen's character in Le Mans (film)
 Naamua Delaney, news anchor for CNN
 Padraic Delaney, Irish actor
 Pat Delaney (disambiguation), multiple people
 Pat Delaney (footballer) (born 1940), Scottish footballer
 Pat Delaney (Kilkenny hurler) (1942–2013), Irish hurler
 Pat Delaney (Offaly hurler) (born 1954), Irish hurler
 Pat Delany (born 1969), American politician
 Paul Delaney (disambiguation), multiple people
 Paul Delaney (hurler) (born 1966), Irish hurler
 Paul Delaney (professor) (fl. 1980s–2020s), professor of physics and astronomy in Toronto
 Paul Delaney (basketball) (born 1986), American basketball player
 Paul Delaney (rugby league) (born 1971), rugby league footballer
 Rob Delaney (born 1977), American comedian, writer, and actor
 Rob Delaney (baseball) (born 1984), baseball player and coach
 Robert Delaney (disambiguation), multiple people
 Robert Delaney (cat burglar) (died 1948), British criminal
 Robert Delaney (composer) (1903–1956), American composer
 Ron Delany (born 1935) Irish gold medal Olympic athlete
 Samuel R. Delany (born 1942), American science fiction author
 Sarah Louise Delany "Sadie" (1889–1999), with sister "Bessie", African-American activist and author
 Sean Delaney (disambiguation), multiple people
 Sean Delaney (musician) (1945–2003), American musician, producer, and road manager
 Sean Delaney (sportsman) "Goggie" (1949–2004), Gaelic games sportsman from Ireland
 Sean Delaney (actor) (born 1994), British actor of English-Irish descent
 Shelagh Delaney FRSL (1938–2011), British playwright
 Stephen Delaney (born 1962/63), Irish cyclist
 Thomas A. Delaney (1886–1969), American lawyer and politician
 Thomas Delaney (born 1991), Danish footballer, of US-Irish descent
 Thomas Delany (1868–1939), Irish lawyer and politician
 Tom Delaney (racing driver) (1911–2006), British racing driver
 Tom Delaney (songwriter), (1889–1963), American songwriter
 William Delaney (1866–1921), Australian cricketer
 William Delany (politician) (1855–1916), Irish MP for Queen's County Ossory
 William Delany (bishop) (1804–1886)
 William Delany (Jesuit) (1835–1924), President of University College Dublin

See also
 Delaney (given name), including a list of people with the given name
 Delaney clause,1958 amendment to the Food, Drugs, and Cosmetic Act of 1938
 John A. Delaney Student Union
 John Delaney 2020 presidential campaign
 Slaney

References

English-language surnames
Surnames of Irish origin
Anglicised Irish-language surnames